Dellslow is an unincorporated community in Monongalia County, West Virginia, United States. Dellslow was established in 1798 and is located along West Virginia Route 7 near the southern border of Brookhaven. Dellslow has a post office with ZIP code 26531.

The community derives its name from Fredelsloh, Germany, the hometown of an early settler.

Climate
The climate in this area has mild differences between highs and lows, and there is adequate rainfall year-round.  According to the Köppen Climate Classification system, Dellslow has a marine west coast climate, abbreviated "Cfb" on climate maps.

References

Unincorporated communities in Monongalia County, West Virginia
Unincorporated communities in West Virginia